The 3rd Hanoi International Film Festival opened on November 23 and closed on November 27, 2014, at Hanoi Friendship Cultural Palace, with the slogan "Cinema - Integration and Sustainable Development" (Vietnamese: "Điện ảnh - Hội nhập và phát triển bền vững").

130 films from 33 countries were selected to be screened at the festival. In which, there will be 13 feature-length films and 30 short films participating in the competition.

Programs
Many activities took place within the framework of this film festival, including "The Film Project Market" which was held for the first time.

Ceremonies - At Hanoi Friendship Cultural Palace, 91 Trần Hưng Đạo Street, Hoàn Kiếm District:
 Opening ceremony: 19:00, Sunday, November 23 (live broadcast on VTV1)
 Closing ceremony: 19:00, Thursday, November 27 (live broadcast on VTV1)

Professional Activities - At Hanoi Daewoo Hotel, 360 Kim Mã Street, Ba Đình District:
 Exhibition: To promote the filming scene and famous destinations of Vietnam (Vietnamese: "Quảng bá bối cảnh quay phim và những điểm đến nổi tiếng của Việt Nam"), opening 11:00, Sunday, November 23
 The HANIFF Campus: opening 9:00, Sunday, November 23, closing ceremony during 12:00-14:00 Thursday, November 27
 Seminar during 9:00-12:00 Tuesday, November 25
 The Film Market Project: opening 9:00 Monday, November 24, closing 14:00 Tuesday, November 25 
 Seminar: Film production cooperation between Vietnam and other countries (Vietnamese: "Hợp tác sản xuất phim giữa Việt Nam và các nước"), during 14:00-17:00 on Monday, November 24
 Seminar: Producing and Disseminating Independent Films - Experience from Philippine Cinema (Vietnamese: "Sản xuất và phổ biến phim độc lập -  Kinh nghiệm từ điện ảnh Phi-líp-pin"), 15:00-17:00 Wednesday, November 26

Sightseeing and Themed night:
 Visiting Tràng An Scenic Landscape Complex, Ninh Bình Province, Tuesday, November 25
 Visiting Vietnamese Ethnology Museum, No. 01 Nguyễn Văn Huyên Street, Cầu Giấy District, 14:00, Wednesday, November 26
 The Hanoi Night Gala, 19:00, Wednesday, November 26 at Imperial Citadel of Thăng Long

Movie screenings in theaters and exchange program of artists with the audience:
 Showtimes: 9:00 - 23:00, November 23 to 27
 Theaters:
 National Cinema Center, 87 Láng Hạ Street, Ba Đình District
 Kim Đồng Cinema Theater, 19 Hàng Bài Street, Hoàn Kiếm District
 August Cinema Theater, 45 Hàng Bài Street, Hoàn Kiếm District
 CGV Cinemas, 6th floor, Hanoi Vincom Building, 191 Bà Triệu Street, Hai Bà Trưng District
 CGV Cinemas, 5th floor, Mipec Tower, 229 Tây Sơn Street, Đống Đa District
 Tickets:All movie tickets at this festival are free, however, audiences will have to book 1 day in advance.

Juries & Mentors

Juries
Like previous years, 3 jury panels were established for this film festival:

Feature film:
 Kirill Razlogov , film critic, director of Cinema Institute for Cultural Study in Russia, Moscow International Film Festival programmer - Chairman
 Niv Fichman , producer
 Peque Gallaga , director
 Lee Doo-yong , director
 Hồng Ánh , actress, producer

Short film:
 Lê Lâm  , art director, professor at IDHEC Film School (France) - Chairman
 Joe Bateman , Director of Rushes Soho Shorts Film Festival
 Bùi Thạc Chuyên , director, manager of The Center for Assistance and Development of Movie Talents (Vietnam Cinema Department)

Network for Promotion of Asian Cinema (NETPAC):
 Jeannette Paulson Hereniko , television scriptwriter, producer, President of AsiaPacificFilms.com, founder of Hawaii International Film Festival - Chairman
 Hauvick Habéchian , film critic
 Lưu Nghiệp Quỳnh , screenwriter

Mentors for the HANIFF Campus
The HANIFF Campus consists of 3 classes: visual director class, screenwriter class and directing class. In addition, the creation camp also has seminars and specialized seminars to exchange experiences and expertise among filmmakers. Activities under the guidance and teaching of mentors:
 Joe Lawlor , producer, director, writer
 Cho Young-jik , cinematographer
 Uli Gaulke , director
 Allen Dizon , actor
 Nguyễn Hoàng Điệp , director

Official Selection - In Competition

Feature film
There are 11 films were selected to compete for the official awards in Feature Film category.

The double-dagger indicates films selected to compete for the NETPAC Award.
Highlighted title indicates Best Feature Film Award winner.

NETPAC
There are 2 films selected to compete only for the NETPAC Award along with 7 films from the Best Feature Film competing list.

Short film
These 30 short films were selected to compete for official awards in Short Film category:

Short:
 A Farewell Party (13′) 
 Cambodia 2099 (21′)  
 Close, Open / Đóng vào, mở ra (22′) 
 Curtain Call (8′) 
 Enough (13′) 
 Fighting For (19′) 
 Gyges (21′) 
 Herding (23′) 
 Jack Boy / 잭보이 (19′) 
 Red Stop (10′) 
 Somewhere Only We Know / วันเวลาที่ผ่านเลยไป (20′) 
 The Day After / Kinabukasan (17′) 
 The Escapee / Trốn chạy (15′) 
 The Girl from Tomorrow / 来自未来的陪伴 (14′) 
 The Last Audition (15′) 
 The Pool Man / 泳漾 (30′) 
 Violin / WhyLean (15′) 
 Waiting For Colors / Menunggu Warna (12′) 
 What's Out There? / Ngoài kia có gì (14′) 

Documentary:
 Agraria Road / Lebuh Agraria (30′) 
 André Menras - A Vietnamese / André Menras - Một người Việt (30′) 
 I Sell Myself / Tôi đi bán tôi (16′) 
 Light in the Air / Ánh sáng giữa tầng không (24′) 
 Talking To My Best Friend / Trò chuyện với bạn thân (13′) 
 The Last Public Letter Writer In Ho Chi Minh City / Người viết thư thuê cuối cùng ở Thành phố Hồ Chí Minh (19′) 
 When I'd Come Back / Bao giờ về (15′) 

Animated:
 Crack (7′) 
 Mỵ Châu - Trọng Thủy (30′) 
 Straw Man / Bù nhìn rơm (10′) 
 The Tail of Lizard / Đuôi của thằn lằn (12′) 

Highlighted title indicates Best Short Film Award winner.

Official Selection - Out of Competition
These films were selected for out-of-competition screening programs:

The dagger  indicates films labeled NC 16

Opening
 Sivas – Kaan Müjdeci

Panorama: World Cinema

Feature film

 (Sex) Appeal / 寒蟬效應 – Wang Weiming   
 Aimless / Lạc lối – Phạm Nhuệ Giang  
 And a Verse Called Life / অনুব্রত ভালো আছো? – Partha Sen 
 Broken / 방황하는 칼날  – Lee Jeong-ho  
 Brothers: The Final Confession / Брати. Остання сповідь – Viktoria Trofimenko 
 Camille Claudel 1915 – Bruno Dumont 
 Dubrovskiy / Дубровский – Kirill Mikhanovsky, Aleksandr Vartanov 
 Gentle / Dịu dàng – Lê Văn Kiệt  
 I'm Still / Sigo Siendo – Javier Corcuera 
 I.D. – Kamal K. M. 
 Ilo Ilo / 爸媽不在家 – Anthony Chen 
 Kami Histeria – Shamyl Othman 
 Living With History / Sống cùng lịch sử – Nguyễn Thanh Vân 
 Me, Myself and Mum / Les garçons et Guillaume, à table! – Guillaume Gallienne 
 Melbourne / ملبورن – Nima Javidi 
 Philomena – Stephen Frears 
 Red Amnesia / 闯入者 – Wang Xiaoshuai 
 Renoir – Gilles Bourdos  
 Rise / Hương ga – Cường Ngô  
 Shopping – Mark Albiston, Louis Sutherland 
 Soekarno – Hanung Bramantyo 
 Star / Звезда – Anna Melikian 
 The Isthmus / ที่ว่างระหว่างสมุทร – Sopawan Boonnimitra, Peerachai Kerdsint 
 The Legend Makers / Những người viết huyền thoại – Bùi Tuấn Dũng 
 The Paternal House / خانه پدری – Kianoush Ayari 
 The Red Violin / Le Violon Rouge – François Girard    
 The Sacred Arrow / 五彩神箭 – Pema Tseden 
 The Selfish Giant – Clio Barnard 
 Thread of Lies / 우아한 거짓말 – Lee Han 
 Tunnel of Love: The Place for Miracles / クレヴァニ、愛のトンネル – Imazeki Akiyoshi 
 With You, Without You / ඔබ නැතුව ඔබ එක්ක – Prasanna Vithanage 
 Yves Saint Laurent – Jalil Lespert

Documentary Feature film

 As Time Goes By in Shanghai – Uli Gaulke 
 Jazz in Love – Baby Ruth Villarama 
 Little Hanoi – Martina Saková  
 Masked Monkey - The Evolution Of Darwin's Theory – Ismail Fahmi Lubish 
 Sad Songs of Happiness – Constanze Knoche 
 The Empire of Shame / 탐욕의 제국 – Hong Li-gyeong 
 The Missing Picture / L'Image manquante – Rithy Panh  
 Thiện Nhân: The Human Flame / Lửa Thiện Nhân – Đặng Hồng Giang

Short film

Short:
 Backyard (12′) 
 Chicken (15′)  
 Glitch (4′) 
 Nostalgia (4′) 

Documentary:
 Dr. Tran Duy Hung - A Hanoian / Bác sĩ Trần Duy Hưng - Một người Hà Nội (32′) 
 Hanoi In My Heart / Hà Nội Trong Tôi (29′) 
 Moana: The Rising of the Sea (35′) 
 Royal Recognition / Đạo sắc phong (30′) 
 Stem Cell Application / Ứng dụng tế bào gốc (29′) 
 The Encounter of the Dragon and the Clouds / Long vân khánh hội (35′) 
 Travel To The Country That No Longer Exists (43′) 

Animated:
 Beluga (2′) 
 Birthday  (3′) 
 Bookends (3′) 
 Broken Wand (3′) 
 Butterfly Song (3′) 
 Cigarette Smoke / Khói thuốc lá (10′) 
 Fire Fin Leader / Thủ lĩnh vây lửa (10′) 
 Monster (2′) 
 Nexus (2′) 
 Parcel Quest (2′) 
 Plucking White Turnip / Nhổ củ cải (14′) 
 Rhacophorus & Hylarana / Chẫu Chàng - Chẫu Chuộc (10′) 
 Seed (2′)

Country-in-Focus: Philippines 
For the Country-in-Focus Program this year, 6 Filipino independent films produced in 2013 were selected as follows:
 Lauriana – Mel Chionglo
 Otso – Elwood Perez
 Rekorder – Mikhail Red
 Sonata – Lore Reyes, Peque Gallaga
 Transit – Hannah Espia
 What Are the Colors of Forgotten Dreams? / Ano ang kulay ng mga nakalimutang pangarap? – Jose Javier Reyes

NETPAC Award-winning Films
 CR No: 89 / ക്രൈം നമ്പർ: 89 – Sudevan 
 Harmony Lessons / Асланның сабақтары – Emir Baigazin 
 Justice / Hustisya – Joel Lamangan 
 The Patience Stone / سنگ صبور – Atiq Rahimi   
 What They Don't Talk About When They Talk About Love / yang tidak dibicarakan ketika membicarakan cinta – Mouly Surya

Contemporary Vietnamese Films 

 Âm mưu giày gót nhọn / How to Fight in Six Inch Heels – Hàm Trần
 Bước khẽ đến hạnh phúc / Gentle Steps to Happiness – Lưu Trọng Ninh 
 Căn phòng của mẹ / Homostratus – Síu Phạm 
 Đoạt hồn / Hollow – Hàm Trần 
 Scandal: Hào quang trở lại / Scandal 2  – Victor Vu 
 Hiệp sĩ mù / Blind Warrior – Lưu Huỳnh 
 Lạc giới / Paradise in Heart – Phi Tiến Sơn 
 Mùa hè lạnh / Cold Summer – Ngô Quang Hải 
 Nước 2030 / 2030 – Nguyễn Võ Nghiêm Minh 
 Quả tim máu / Vengeful Heart – Victor Vu
 Thần tượng / The Talent – Nguyễn Quang Huy

Awards
The official awards were awarded at the closing ceremony of the festival, on the evening of October 31. The HANIFF Campus and Film Project Market organized their own awards ceremony for their participants before.

In Competition - Feature film
 Best Feature Film: Two Women 
 Jury Prize for Feature Film: Flapping in the Middle of Nowhere  
 Other nominees: The Coffin Maker , Fish & Cat , The Weight of Elephants 
 Best Director: Shahram Mokri – Fish & Cat 
 Other nominees: Vera Glagoleva – Two Women , Bang Eun-jin – Way Back Home 
 Best Leading Actor: Allen Dizon – The Coffin Maker 
 Other nominees: Thanh Duy – Flapping in the Middle of Nowhere , Go Soo – Way Back Home 
 Best Leading Actress: Anna Astrakhantseva – Two Women 
 Other nominees: Thùy Anh – Flapping in the Middle of Nowhere , Dina Tukubayeva – Nagima 
 Special Mention for Child Actor: Demos Murphy – The Weight of Elephants

In Competition - Short film
 Best Short Film: Waiting for Colors – Adriyanto Dewo 
 Jury Prize for Short Film: What's Out There? – Nguyễn Diệp Thùy Anh 
 Other nominees: Herding – Ruslan Akun , Cambodia 2099 – Davy Chou  , Crack – Ahn Yong-hae 
 Best Young Director of a Short Film: Ruslan Akun – Herding 
 Other nominees: Trần Thế Khương – The Last Public Letter Writer In Ho Chi Minh City , Đỗ Quốc Trung – Close, Open

NETPAC Award
 NETPAC's Award for Asian Cinema Promotion: The Coffin Maker

The HANIFF Campus
 Best Student - D.O.P Class: Nguyễn Minh Tiến 
 Best Student - Screenwriting Class: Nguyễn Thị Mỹ Trang 
 Best Student - Directing Class: Shin-il

The Film Project Market
 Best Project: Honeygiver Among the Dogs – Dechen Roder 
 Jury Prize for Film Project: A Shade of Paradise – Síu Phạm 
 Other nominees: 30 Days of Ginger – Teo Eng Tiong , A Wrong Season – Carlo Francisco Manatad , We Ain’t Nice Always – Phan Gia Nhật Linh

References

External links
 

2014 film festivals
Hanoi International Film Festival
2014 in Vietnam
2014 in Vietnamese cinema